Stadion Beroe (also nicknamed The Temple) is a multi-purpose stadium in Stara Zagora, Bulgaria. It is located in the north-western part of the city, near the park Ayazmoto. Currently, the venue is used for football matches and athletic competitions and is also the home ground of the local football club PFC Beroe Stara Zagora. The stadium has a seating capacity of 12,128 spectators and it was officially inaugurated on April 4, 1959.

The stadium's athletic lane meets all of the IAAF requirements to host international competitions.
In October 2011, a new floodlight system and a new scoreboard were installed.
The record attendance of the stadium is 42,000 and it was achieved in an A Group match between Beroe and Levski Sofia in 1972.

National team matches

2013 UEFA Euro U-17 Q

2015 UEFA Euro U-21 Q

2015 UEFA Euro U-21 Q

2015 UEFA Euro U-21 Q

2015 UEFA European Under-17 Championship - OPENING MATCH

See also
List of football stadiums in Bulgaria

References

External links
 Official website of the football club
 bgclubs.eu

Football venues in Bulgaria
Multi-purpose stadiums in Bulgaria
Buildings and structures in Stara Zagora
Sport in Stara Zagora